The Great Detective is a Canadian television drama, which aired on CBC from 1979 to 1982. It starred Douglas Campbell and James Dugan.

Background
The Great Detective was inspired by the exploits of John Wilson Murray, Canada's first government-appointed detective, set in the latter part of the Victorian era. The leading character, Inspector Alistair Cameron, was a fictional counterpart of Murray. Inspector Cameron was ably assisted by his friend, forensic scientist Dr. Chisholm.  A taped series, The Great Detective was produced on location at Rockwood, Kleinburg and Shadow Lake in Ontario, as well as Victoria, areas of downtown Toronto and CBC's television Studio 7.

External links

 The Great Detective at Canadian Communications Foundation
 TVArchive

1970s Canadian drama television series
1980s Canadian crime drama television series
CBC Television original programming
1979 Canadian television series debuts
1982 Canadian television series endings
Television shows set in Toronto